Eucalyptus vokesensis, commonly known as the Vokes Hill mallee, is a species of mallee that is endemic to South Australia. It has rough bark on the lower stems and larger branches, broadly lance-shaped to broadly egg-shaped adult leaves, flower buds in group of nine to thirteen, pale yellow flowers and cup-shaped to barrel-shaped fruit.

Description
It has rough, fibrous grey to grey-brown bark on the stems and larger branches, with smooth tan, grey, or cream-coloured bark above. Young plants and coppice regrowth have stems that are usually square in cross-section and leaves that are egg-shaped to lance-shaped or elliptical and usually glaucous. Flowering has been recorded from July to September and the flowers are pale yellow.

Taxonomy
Eucalyptus vokesensis was first formally described in 1999 by Dean Nicolle and Lawrence Alexander Sidney Johnson in the journal Telopea, included in a paper by Johnson and Ken Hill. The specific epithet comes from the locality in which the type specimen was found. Vokes Hill was named during an expedition by explorer Richard Maurice in 1901. His general hand and cook on the journey was W. Voke or Voakes.

Distribution and habitat
The species is endemic to an arid area of western South Australia in the Great Victoria Desert where it grows in deep red sandy soils on and around sand dunes and broad swales in open mallee communities.

See also
List of Eucalyptus species

References

Trees of Australia
vokesensis
Myrtales of Australia
Flora of South Australia
Plants described in 1999